Lenni Hämeenaho (Born 7 November 2004) is a Finnish professional ice hockey right wing who currently plays for Porin Ässät of the Finnish Liiga. He has generally been considered one of the most promising players in his age group, and as the 2022–2023 season progresses, Hämeenaho is expected to be a first-round selection at the NHL draft in 2023.

Playing career

Junior 
According to Hämeenaho himself, he started playing ice hockey at the age of four. His youth team was Kajaanin Hokki and he played there until spring 2018, until Hämeenaho moved to Ylivieska Jääkarhut's C-junior team at the age of 13 together with his older brother Veikka. The entire Hämeenaho family also moved to Ylivieska. Lenni was the team's best scorer in both the C-junior Mestis Qualifiers with 20+26=46 and the C-junior Mestis with 8+19=27.

For the 2019–2020 season, Hämeenaho, together with his brother Veikka and defender Valtteri Viirret, moved from YJK to Porin Ässät through a tryout, when the club's coaching manager Jaakko Välimaa contacted them. The entire Hämeenaho family moved to Pori so the brothers could play in Ässät.

Professional

Porin Ässät (2022–present) 
In April 2022, Hämeenaho signed a three-year Liiga contract with Ässät. He made his Liiga debut when he was only 17 years old in the opening round of the 2022–2023 season on September 14, 2022 in an away game against Tampereen Ilves. Hämeenaho was placed on the right wing in Ässät's fourth line next to Kalle Myllymaa and Niklas Appelgren. He got 13.26 minutes of ice time in the match. Hämeenaho scored his first goal in Liiga with two goals on October 29, 2022 away against KooKoo. In the match that ended in Ässät's 4–3 loss, he was involved in every goal of his team, and Hämeenaho was marked with a power rating of +3. Miika Katajainen chose him as the third star of the match.

International play 

Hämeenaho reprecented Finland in the European Youth Olympic Festival in 2022. Hämeenaho scored 2 goals in the tournament and got a total of 5 points. Hämeenaho played in the U18 World Championship with Finland in 2022, where Finland won bronze. In a game against Sweden, he was chosen as Finland's best player of the game. 

Hämeenaho reprecented Finland in the 2023 World Junior Championships. Hämeenaho played 5 games and got 2 points.

Personal life 
Hämeenaho's brother, Veikka, also plays in the Ässät organization, currently in the U20 team. Hämeenaho's father, Jarmo, reprecented Kajaanin Hokki in the Mestis and has been a coach for Hokki's and Ässät's junior teams.

Hämeenaho is currently studying in the Porin Suomalainen Yhteislyseo (PSYL)

Career statistics

Regular season and playoffs

International

References

External links

2004 births
Living people
Ässät players
Finnish ice hockey players
Kokkolan Hermes players